Zdenko Zorko (born 18 August 1950) is a Croatian former handball player who competed in the 1972 Summer Olympics and in the 1976 Summer Olympics for Yugoslavia.

In his youth Zdenko Zorko played football in NK Dinamo Zagreb before playing handball.

In 1972 he was part of the Yugoslav team which won the gold medal at the Munich Games. He played one match as goalkeeper.

Four years later he was a member of the Yugoslav team which finished fifth in the Olympic tournament. He played four matches as goalkeeper.

Honours
Player
Zagreb
Yugoslav Second League - (North) (1): 1978–79
Yugoslav Second League - (West) (1): 1981–82

Coach
Zagreb
Yugoslav Second League - (North) (1): 1987–88
Croatian Premier Handball League (1): 1999–00
Croatian Cup (1): 2000

Individual
Franjo Bučar State Award for Sport - 2012

References

External links
 profile

1950 births
Living people
Croatian male handball players
Olympic handball players of Yugoslavia
Yugoslav male handball players
Handball players at the 1972 Summer Olympics
Handball players at the 1976 Summer Olympics
Olympic gold medalists for Yugoslavia
Olympic medalists in handball
Medalists at the 1972 Summer Olympics
Mediterranean Games gold medalists for Yugoslavia
Competitors at the 1975 Mediterranean Games
Competitors at the 1993 Mediterranean Games
Competitors at the 2001 Mediterranean Games
Croatian handball coaches
Mediterranean Games gold medalists for Croatia
Mediterranean Games medalists in handball